The 1972 NCAA College Division football rankings are from the United Press International poll of College Division head coaches and from the Associated Press poll of sportswriters and broadcasters.  The 1972 NCAA College Division football season was the 15th year UPI published a Coaches Poll and the 13th year for the AP. Both polls started to use the term "College Division" in 1972, but many of the referenced publications continued to use the "Small College" terminology.

1972 was the last year the polls would be used to crown a national "Small College" or "College Division" champion. In 1973, season-ending playoffs were begun to determine a champion for "Division II". The UPI and AP continued publishing "College Division" polls through the 1974 season.

Legend

The AP poll

The UPI Coaches poll

Notes

References

Rankings
NCAA College Division football rankings